Jacob-Jan Esmeijer also simply known as JJ Esmeijer (born May 28, 1972 in Rotterdam, South Holland) is a former Dutch cricketer. He is a right-handed batsman and a slow left-arm bowler. Esmeijer has played for Somerset's second XI.

International career
He was Dutch's top spin-bowler at the 2003 Cricket World Cup. Although he bowled with good control and an excellent (for an Associate-level spinner) economy rate of 5 runs per over, he was unlucky not to capture a wicket in any of the 4 matches he played in that tournament.

Sources
Jacob-Jan Esmeijer at Cricinfo

1972 births
Living people
Dutch cricketers
Netherlands One Day International cricketers
Sportspeople from Rotterdam